The bezoar ibex (Capra aegagrus aegagrus) is a wild goat subspecies that is native to the montane forested areas in the Caucasus and the Zagros Mountains.

Characteristics 
Males have a dark brown summer coat, while the females have a more reddish-gold, and both sexes shift to a gray-colored coat in winter. Both sexes also have a tuft of hair extending from the chin. The ibexes have a black stripe from the spine that extends over the shoulder, limbs, and neck. This stripe darkens in the mating season.

Distribution and habitat
In the Greater Caucasus, the bezoar ibex ranges from the upper Argun river in Georgia to Chechnya, in the Andi Koisu and Avar Koisu river basins in Daghestan and Tusheti up to the headwaters of the Jurmut river. In the Lesser Caucasus, it occurs in the mountain ranges in Azerbaijan and Armenia, including the Zangezur Mountains, Meghri, Mrovdagh, Karabakh and Delidagh ranges.
In Iran, it is widely distributed and lives in rocky terrain, mountainous areas, on cliffs along the seashore, deciduous forests and in some areas in the Dasht-e Kavir desert.
In Iraq, it occurs in the Zagros Mountains along the borders with Turkey and Iran.

Introduced 
The goat populations on some Aegean islands and in Crete were introduced during the prehistoric period and constitute relict populations of the domestic goat (Capra hircus) that are now feral. The bezoar ibex is one of the domestic goat's progenitors. Wild goats are thought to have been domesticated at least 10,000 years Before Present. In the United States, bezoar ibex were introduced to the Florida mountains in New Mexico in 1970. Initially only 15 were imported from Iran but in 1974 an additional 27 were released.

Hybrid bezoar ibex 
The hybrid ibex is a cross between a wild bezoar ibex and a domestic goat. It occurs in several localities in one district of Turkey and crosses over habitats with the bezoar in some of these areas. Hybrids tend to be very similar to the bezoar ibex, but have much longer, floppier ears and a longer coat. The most prominent difference may be the horns, which flare out significantly in comparison to those of a true ibex.

References

Capra (genus)
Goats
Fauna of Armenia
Ibex, Bezoar
Mammals of Europe
Mammals of Azerbaijan
Mammals of Afghanistan
Mammals of Turkey
Mammals described in 1777